Cristian Andrés Saavedra Iturriaga (born 14 June 1961) is a Chilean football manager and former footballer who played as a forward for clubs in Chile, Mexico and Bolivia.

Playing career
A historical player of Colo-Colo, he made his debut in 1980 thanks to the coach Pedro Morales, making after up a pair with Carlos Caszely. He stayed with club until 1987, winning the league titles in 1981, 1983 and 1986 as well as the Copa Polla Gol in 1981, 1982 and 1985.

In his homeland, he also played for Unión Española (1988), Deportes La Serena (1989) and Cobresal (1990) in the top division.

Abroad, he played for Santos Laguna (1988–89) in its first season in the Mexican Primera División, Meline (1990) in Belgium and Jorge Wilstermann (1991) in Bolivia, his last club, where made fourteen appearances and scored 6 goals.

Managerial career
As a football coach, he is more known for having worked as assistant of Claudio Borghi in both Colo-Colo and Independiente.

He also worked as coach of the Audax Italiano youth ranks and Lautaro de Buin.

In addition, he served as sport manager of Deportes Pintana in 2014–15.

Personal life
As a young player of Colo-Colo, he was nicknamed Lolo Gol (The Goal Teenager).

Honours

As player
Colo-Colo
 Chilean Primera División (3): 1981, 1983, 1986
 Copa Polla Gol (3): 1981, 1982, 1985

References

External links
 
 Cristian Saavedra at PlaymakerStats.com
 

1961 births
Living people
Footballers from Santiago
Chilean footballers
Chilean expatriate footballers
Colo-Colo footballers
Unión Española footballers
Santos Laguna footballers
Deportes La Serena footballers
Cobresal footballers
C.D. Jorge Wilstermann players
Chilean Primera División players
Liga MX players
Bolivian Primera División players
Chilean expatriate sportspeople in Mexico
Chilean expatriate sportspeople in Belgium
Chilean expatriate sportspeople in Bolivia
Expatriate footballers in Mexico
Expatriate footballers in Belgium
Expatriate footballers in Bolivia
Association football forwards
Chilean football managers
Chilean expatriate football managers
Chilean expatriate sportspeople in Argentina
Expatriate football managers in Argentina